Zheng Enchong (born 2 September 1950) is a Shanghai-based Weiquan (rights defending) lawyer. Zheng was sentenced in 2003 to three years in prison for his advocacy on behalf of citizens who had been forcibly evicted from their homes. The charge stemmed from two faxes Zheng was alleged to have sent to the New York-based organisation Human Rights in China concerning workers' protests. Upon his release from prison, he remained under house arrest.

His lawyer Guo Guoting was allegedly forbidden to see him. Guo Guoting now lives in Canada.

Zheng Enchong had advised more than 500 families displaced by Shanghai's urban redevelopment projects on their rights to fair compensation. In 2005, he received the Human Rights Award of the German Association of Judges.

Biography

A lawyer from Shanghai, represented or advised around 500 families who were evicted due to urban redevelopment in the city, and who received little or no compensation from the authorities. He was detained in June 2003, days after a group of evicted residents he had advised appeared in court attempting to sue the authorities for adequate compensation, alleging collusion between officials and a wealthy property developer.

Zheng, Enchong was later charged and sentenced to three years in prison for "supplying state secrets to foreign entities" in connection with faxes he sent to Human Rights in China, an NGO based in New York. There are serious concerns that Zheng, Enchong's detention and conviction were aimed at preventing him from continuing with his advocacy work. A lasting effect of his conviction has been a reported decrease in the number of lawyers in Shanghai willing to "risk" defending people's rights to housing for fear of reprisals.

On December 8, 2005, the German Judges Association presented Zheng Enchong with its “Human Rights Award” at a reception attended by the German president. Jiang Meili was invited to receive the award on Zheng's behalf, but his wife Jiang Meili was restricted from leaving China. Therefore, a petitioner of Hong Kong accepted the award on his behalf.

Zheng, Enchong was released on June 5, 2006, but remained under house arrest.

Further reading
 Congressional-Executive Commission on China, Rights and Rule of Law - News and Analysis: Authorities Punish Imprisoned Activist Zheng Enchong After He Receives Human Rights Award, 4 January 2006 
Member of European Parliament Discusses Sensitive Issues With China Rights Lawyer in Shanghai (part 1), 28 November 2008
Member of European Parliament Discusses Sensitive Issues With China Rights Lawyer in Shanghai (part 2), 28 November 2008
 China Aid, Christian Attorney Zheng Enchong Interrogated and Tortured by China Police, 23 June 2009
Radio Sound of Hope, 21 June 2009
Jerome A. Cohen, “SHANGHAIED” AT HOME — AND FOREVER?", NYU U.S.-Asia Law Institute, 9 June 2010
Jerome A. Cohen and Yu-Jie Chen, 'Prisoner in his own home', South China Morning Post, June 10, 2010 
Joseph Kahn, China: Lawyer Sentenced, New York Times, 29 October 2003 
Howard W. French, A Mild Shanghai Lawyer and His Accidental Crusade, New York Times, 18 September 2004
Howard W. French, Scandals Emerging in Shanghai as Political Season Nears, New York Times, 5 September 2006  
Howard W. French, Police Said to Have Assaulted Rights Lawyer in China New York Times, 26 February 2008 
Human Rights in China, Further Harassment of Zheng Enchong’s Wife, 4 March 2004

References

1950 births
Living people
Charter 08 signatories
Weiquan movement
20th-century Chinese lawyers
21st-century Chinese lawyers